Wise Gap is an unincorporated community in Monroe County, Mississippi.

It is located near the intersection of U.S. Route 278 and Mississippi Highway 8.

According to the United States Geological Survey, a variant name is Wise's Gap.

References

Unincorporated communities in Monroe County, Mississippi
Unincorporated communities in Mississippi